Allen Frazier Leavell (born May 27, 1957) is a retired American professional basketball player from Muncie, Indiana.

Career

Amateur
At Muncie Central High School, Leavell averaged 18 points per game in his final year. A 6'1" (1.85 m), 170 lb (77 kg) point guard, he enrolled in Oklahoma City University and played for the then-Division 1 Men's Basketball Team, averaging 22 points in 1978-1979.

Playing career
Leavell was selected in the fifth round of the 1979 NBA draft by the Houston Rockets, going on to play ten seasons in the National Basketball Association (NBA), all as a member of the Rockets, appearing in exactly 700 games in the regular season. On January 25, 1983, he set a franchise record with 22 assists in a game.  Over the whole 1982-1983 season, he was the team's leaders in points, steals, and assists.

Leavell was waived early in the 1986-87 season by the Rockets and then signed again a few months later after the team lost two players due to drug suspensions.

In his NBA career, he averaged 9.5 points per game and 4.8 assists per game.  Leavell participated in two NBA Finals (in 1981 and 1986), in two losses against the Boston Celtics. He finishes as the third all-time with the Rocket Franchise in both assists (3,339) and steals (929).

In 1989, he joined the Continental Basketball Association playing for the Tulsa Fastbreakers but was suspended after assaulting a referee.

Post-NBA

As someone who played exclusively with the Houston Rockets within the NBA, Leavell remained involved in the team, participating in community outreach and serving as commentator with local outlets.

He is inducted into the Oklahoma City University Hall of Fame.

See also
List of National Basketball Association players with most assists in a game
List of NBA players who have spent their entire career with one franchise

References

External links
Stats at BasketballReference
Stats at Basketball-Reference

1957 births
Living people
American men's basketball players
Basketball players from Indiana
Houston Rockets draft picks
Houston Rockets players
Oklahoma City Stars men's basketball players
Point guards
Rockford Lightning players
Sportspeople from Muncie, Indiana
Tulsa Fast Breakers players